Walter Silz (27 September 1894, Cleveland – 30 May 1980, Princeton, New Jersey) was an American professor of German language and literature and in 1965 winner of the Grosses Verdienstkreuz from West Germany.

Biography
Born to a German-American family in Cleveland, Silz received his A.B. in 1917 and his Ph.D. in 1922 from Harvard University. In 1922 he married Frieda Bertha Ruprecht Osgood, the daughter of William Fogg Osgood; she died in 1937. Silz taught at Harvard and at Washington University in St. Louis before becoming a professor at Swarthmore College. He headed what was then the German section of the department of modern languages at Princeton University from 1948 to 1954. From 1954 to 1963 he held the Gebhard Chair of Germanic Languages and Literatures at Columbia University. He was twice awarded a Guggenheim Fellowship, once for the academic year 1926–1927 and again for the academic year 1960–1961. He died in 1980. His second wife, Priscilla Kramer Silz, was a professor of German at Rider College.

Selected works
as author:

 

as editor:

References

 

1894 births
1980 deaths
Swarthmore College faculty
Princeton University faculty
Columbia University faculty
Columbia University Department of German faculty
Professors of German in the United States
Germanists
Harvard University alumni
Commanders Crosses of the Order of Merit of the Federal Republic of Germany